The 4th constituency of Val-de-Marne is a French legislative constituency in the Val-de-Marne département.

Description

The 4th constituency of Val-de-Marne lies in the east of the constituency, bordering Seine-et-Marne to the east.

In its current incarnation the seat consistently supported conservative candidates until 2017. At the 2012 election Jacques-Alain Bénisti of the UMP was returned with a majority of just 74 votes.

Historic Representation

Election results

2022

 
 
 
 
 
 
 
|-
| colspan="8" bgcolor="#E9E9E9"|
|-

2017

 
 
 
 
 
 
 
|-
| colspan="8" bgcolor="#E9E9E9"|
|-

2012

 
 
 
 
 
 
 
|-
| colspan="8" bgcolor="#E9E9E9"|
|-

2007

 
 
 
 
 
 
 
|-
| colspan="8" bgcolor="#E9E9E9"|
|-

2002

 
 
 
 
 
 
 
|-
| colspan="8" bgcolor="#E9E9E9"|
|-

1997

 
 
 
 
 
 
 
 
|-
| colspan="8" bgcolor="#E9E9E9"|
|-

Sources
Official results of French elections from 2002: "Résultats électoraux officiels en France" (in French).

4